Stachys debilis is a species of flowering plant in the family Lamiaceae. It is found only in Ecuador. Its natural habitats are subtropical or tropical moist montane forests, subtropical or tropical high-altitude shrubland, and subtropical or tropical high-altitude grassland.

References

debilis
Flora of Ecuador
Near threatened plants
Taxonomy articles created by Polbot